Bear is a 2010 American natural horror film directed by Roel Reiné (under the pseudonym of John Rebel) and starring Patrick Scott Lewis and Katie Lowes. The film centers on four people who become the target of an extremely aggressive  and wrathful grizzly bear.

Plot
Businessman Sam, his wife Liz and his musician brother Nick with his girlfriend Christine are driving through a remote countryside to their father's birthday dinner. Several miles into a back road shortcut, they get a flat tire and are unable to get a cell phone signal to call for help. While repairing the tire, Sam berates Nick for wasting his life being a musician, his latest fling with Christine being another mistake on his judgement list.

As they are arguing, they are approached by a grizzly bear. Despite Nick's efforts to convince the group to calmly leave, Sam takes matters into his own hands and shoots the bear down with a handgun. After the bear dies, they are approached by a larger male bear who charges them in revenge, causing them to retreat into their minivan. In his rage, the bear overturns the minivan, trapping the humans inside.

After striding around for several minutes, the bear leaves, allowing the crew to turn the minivan over. But as they start driving, the axles break under both sets of tires, stranding them again. The group tries to leave on foot, but they are ambushed by the bear who chases them to an out-of-ground pipe. He tricks them into leaving for the minivan and attacks again; this time he is able to catch Christine who is killed while the others watch.

Nick begins to think that the bear is taking out his revenge on them one-by-one due to a Native American legend that bears are actually the reincarnated spirits of Shaman and are capable of human thoughts and emotion. Sam dismisses this and they set a trap to try to keep the bear in the car in order for them to escape. The trap is sprung, but Nick is nearly killed by the bear, forcing Sam and Liz to release the bear and retreat back into the vehicle themselves.

Sam opts as a marathon runner to jog the several miles to the restaurant, but when he arrives he is attacked by the bear before he can get help. Meanwhile, Liz tells Nick that she and Sam have been having serious financial troubles which has caused a rift in their marriage putting him into extraordinary debt and possibly under scrutiny for embezzlement from Sam's company, which is the reason he gave their father a Porsche (as the banks then wouldn't be able to collect it).

Sam is returned rather violently by the bear and released to climb into the car. Nick surmises there must be a reason Sam had been returned, and Liz reveals to him that she's pregnant. But it was established earlier that due to the rift in their marriage, they hadn't slept together in about six months while she is two months pregnant. Nick realizes that he is the father, from an affair he and Liz had months prior.

This breaks Sam's heart as Nick realizes the true reason the bear had locked all three of them together; Nick, realizing that Liz might be happier with Sam, offers to sacrifice himself and attack the bear so the other two can escape. As Nick is dying, Sam gives Liz a parting kiss and attempts to attack the bear with a stick, but is killed as well. 

The bear then approaches Liz, who sinks to her knees as the bear sniffs her, closing her eyes ready to die. But the attack never comes, and the bear instead leaves her alone, likely having sensed her pregnancy, further acknowledging the Shaman legend. As she begins down the road by herself, the camera turns to the bodies of Sam and Nick lying next to each other and the screen goes black.

Cast
 Katie Lowes as Christine
 Mary Alexandra Stiefvater as Liz
 Patrick Scott Lewis as Sam
 Brendan Michael Coughlin as Nick
 The bear was played by “Blue”, an adult male grizzly bear provided by Bear–Necessities Ranch

Release
The film was released on DVD on January 1, 2010. It was later re-released that same year both on DVD and Blu-ray by Otter Creek Motion Pictures on September 28.

Reception

The film received mostly negative reviews from critics. Digital Retribution gave the film a score of 2.5 out of 5, criticizing the film's poor acting, inane script, and unintentional humor. Dread Central awarded the film a negative score of 2 1/2 out of 5, criticizing the film's long dull stretches, but complimented the film's generation of pathos for the characters during the finale. HorrorNews.net gave the film a negative review, criticizing the film's sloppy production, poor lighting, and weak execution, but complimented the film's acting.

References

External links
 
 
 

2010s English-language films
2010 horror films
American natural horror films
Films shot in California
American independent films
2010 films
Films about bears
Grizzly bears in popular culture
Films with screenplays by Ethan Wiley
2010 directorial debut films
2010 independent films
2010s American films